DTDP-dihydrostreptose---streptidine-6-phosphate dihydrostreptosyltransferase (thymidine diphosphodihydrostreptose-streptidine 6-phosphate dihydrostreptosyltransferase) is an enzyme with systematic name dTDP-L-dihydrostreptose:streptidine-6-phosphate dihydrostreptosyltransferase. This enzyme catalyses the following chemical reaction

 dTDP-L-dihydrostreptose + streptidine 6-phosphate  dTDP + O-(1->4)-alpha-L-dihydrostreptosyl-streptidine 6-phosphate

References

External links 
 

EC 2.4.2